Amo (English: "I love") is the eighteenth studio album of Spanish singer Miguel Bosé. The album received a Latin Grammy nomination for Best Contemporary Pop Vocal Album.

Track listing

Charts

Weekly charts

Year-end charts

Certifications

References

2014 albums
Miguel Bosé albums